Rien ne s'arrête (Eng: Nothing Stops) is the name of a compilation by the French singer Patricia Kaas. It was released in 2001 and achieved a good success in various countries.

Background
This compilation was the first one released by the singer. It debuted on October 22, 2001 and was published by her record company, Sony BMG. As indicates on the cover with the mention '1987-2001', the album, actually a best of, contains all Kaas' songs released as singles from her first five studio albums (Mademoiselle chante..., Scène de vie, Je te dis vous, Dans ma chair, Le Mot de passe). However, there are several exceptions : the singles "Elle voulait jouer cabaret" and "Regarde les riches" are not available on this compilation, "Mademoiselle chante le blues" and "Les chansons commencent" were recorded in a live version during the 2000 Le Mot de passe tour, there is a live cover of Barbara's song "L'Aigle noir", "Il me dit que je suis belle" is in its single version, and a new song with eponymous title, "Rien ne s'arrête", features as the first track.

Chart performance
The album was generally well received in the charts. It featured for 18 weeks in Belgium (Wallonia), debuting at #6 on November 3, 2001, before climbing to #3, its highest position, the week after. Even if it almost kept on dropping thereafter, it managed to stabilize for 14 weeks in the top 20. It was ranked #36 on the End of the Year Chart.

In Switzerland, the album started at #23 on November 4, 2001, then reached its peak position, #14, before almost dropping every week. It totaled nine weeks in the top 50 and 14 weeks in the top 100. It was certified Gold disc the same year.

In France, the album entered the compilations chart at #2 on October 27, 2001 and stayed there for another week. It dropped slowly on the chart, totaling seven weeks in the top ten. It disappeared from the chart on the edition of March 2, 2002. It achieved Platinum status.

The best of achieved a moderate success in Germany, peaking at #39, and in Finland, where it was charted for a single week at #38.

Track listings

Credits

Editions
 Strictly Confidential / EMI Music Publishing : "Rien ne s'arrête"
 Back to Paris / Zone Music : "D'Allemagne", "Mon Mec à moi", "Quand Jimmy dit", "Les Hommes qui passent", "Kennedy Rose"
 Back to Paris / Catalogue Moi-Music : "Mademoiselle chante le blues"
 ADN Music / MDG Productions : "Les Mannequins d'osier"
 Pole Music / Good Good Music : "Entrer dans la lumière", "Ceux qui n'ont rien",
 JRG Editions Musicales / Note de blues : "Il me dit que je suis belle"
 Realsongs / EMI (ASCAP) : "Quand j'ai peur de tout"
 JRG Editions Musicales : "Je voudrais la connaître", "Une Fille de l'Est", "Les Chansons commencent"
 Warner-Chappell Music Publishing : "L'Aigle noir"
 Sony-ATC Music Publishing : "Ma Liberté contre la tienne", "Mon Chercheur d'or"

Recording
 Mastering : Tom Coyne at Sterling Sound (New York), except "Rien ne s'arrête" : Tim Young at Metropolis (London)
 Photo : André Rau / H&K
 Design : FKGB
 Management : I.T.C. - Zurich, Switzerland (Cyril Prieur, Richard Walter)

Charts

Weekly charts

Year-end charts

Certifications and sales

References

2001 greatest hits albums
Patricia Kaas albums